Bichhoo is a 2000 Indian Hindi-language action thriller film starring Bobby Deol and Rani Mukerji. Bichhoo is a remake of the 1994 English-language French action thriller film Léon: The Professional.

Synopsis
Jeeva (Bobby Deol) is from a struggling family. He falls in love with Kiran (Malaika Arora Khan). Due to their differences in social class, Kiran's father does not approve of their relationship. To punish Jeeva, Kiran's father frames his mother (Farida Jalal) and two sisters for prostitution and bribes the police into arresting them, which leads to the three of them committing suicide. Kiran also kills herself, ashamed of what her father has done. Jeeva seeks revenge by killing Kiran's father.

He later becomes one of India's most dangerous assassins. He lives in a small apartment next to the Bali family. The father (Ishrat ali) works for a corrupt police officer named Devraj Khatri (Ashish Vidyarthi), who works in the drug trade. Kiran Bali (Rani Mukherji) is the youngest daughter of the family and strongly dislikes them. She tries to befriend Jeeva many times, but he is too engrossed in his killing to have any time for her. One day, Kiran is in Jeeva's apartment delivering milk to him. Whilst she is there, Devraj Khatri comes to Bali's apartment and brutally kills them all — Kiran is the only one to survive as she was in Jeeva's apartment. Jeeva soon finds himself taking Kiran under his wing, and so he trains her in handling weapons to get revenge against the men who had brutally murdered her family.

Relationship to Léon: The Professional
Bichoo is similar to the 1994 English-language French action thriller film Léon: The Professional, written and directed by Luc Besson. Léon: The Professional stars Jean Reno as the titular mob hitman; Gary Oldman as corrupt and unhinged DEA agent Norman Stansfield; a young Natalie Portman, in her feature film debut, as Mathilda, a 12-year-old girl who is reluctantly taken in by Léon after her family is murdered; and Danny Aiello as Tony, the mobster who gives the hitman his assignments. Léon and Mathilda form an unusual relationship, as she becomes his protégée and learns the hitman's trade. A notable difference is that Mathilda is 12 years old and Kiran about 10 years older.

Cast
 Bobby Deol as Jeeva
 Rani Mukherji as Kiran Bali
 Malaika Arora as Kiran 
 Farida Jalal as Jeeva's mother
 Ashish Vidyarthi as Corrupt Assistant Commissioner Of Police Officer Devraj Khatri (in Narcotics Department)
 Sachin Khedekar as Kiran (Rani Mukherji's brother)
 Suresh Chatwal as Shopkeeper
 Veerendra Saxena as Madan Bhai Jeeva's Friend
 Pramod Moutho as Pankaj Kharbanda
 Mohan Joshi as Kiran 's Father
 Avtar Gill as S.K. Puri (Police Commissioner)
 Mahavir Shah as Inspector Khan
 Bhakti Barve as TV Interviewer on television who takes interview of Police Commissioner
 Ishrat Ali as Vikas Bali as Kiran Bali Father
 Dolly Bindra as Mrs Bali as  Kiran Bali Step Mother
 Shweta Shetty as Guest Role (Totte Totte Song)
 Hans Raj Hans as himself
 Janardhan Parab as Security Guard of Society
 Santosh Gupta(actor) as Mumbai Local Train passenger

Soundtrack
All songs written composed by Anand Raj Anand and lyrics written by Sameer. The album consists of 8 songs, including two instrumental tracks. Harry Anand, one of the first musicians to start the trend of bringing out remix music videos in India, singing two songs from the tracks. According to the Indian trade website Box Office India, with around 16,00,000 units sold, this film's soundtrack album was the year's eleventh highest-selling.

Track listing

Reception
The reviews for Bichhoo were mostly positive. Much praise was given to Deol and Mukherjee's performances.

Sequel
Director Guddu Dhanoa has announced that he would make Bichhoo 2, a sequel with Bobby Deol in the central role. The production of the movie is in its preliminary phase; selection of the lead actress is to be done, among other pivotal tasks. In retrospect of the success of Bichhoo, Dhanoa has said that the new venture is special for him. Though he is tentative about the cut and dried date of release of the movie, the director is certain of the movie hitting the screens in the near future.

References

External links

2000 films
2000s Hindi-language films
2000 action thriller films
Films scored by Harry Anand
Indian films about revenge
Indian action thriller films
Indian gangster films
Films scored by Anand Raj Anand
Indian remakes of French films
Hindi remakes of English films
Films about contract killing in India
Films directed by Guddu Dhanoa